Zhang's horned toad (Xenophrys zhangi), or Zhang's spadefoot toad, is a species of frog in the family Megophryidae. It is found in Zhangmu, Nyalam County, Tibet, China (just across the border from Kodari, Nepal).
Its natural habitats are temperate forests and rivers.

References

Xenophrys
Amphibians of China
Endemic fauna of Tibet
Taxonomy articles created by Polbot
Amphibians described in 1992